Jean Yun (윤효진 / 尹孝珍 / Yun Hyo Jean; born March 6, 1958) is a retired competitive figure skater who represented South Korea in the 1976 Winter Olympics as well as the 1975 and 1976 World Figure Skating Championships. Yun was the 1975 and 1976 South Korea National Champion, two-times World Team Member, and a double gold medalist in the U.S. and a double gold medalist in South Korea. From 1969 to 1980, she competed and reached the podium seven times in the ladies' singles at South Korean Figure Skating Championships.

Yun was born in Seoul, South Korea. She is a double Master rated Professional Skaters Association coach in Freestyle & Figure who coaches at East West Ice Palace at Artesia, California and Pickwick Ice Center at Burbank, California.

Career 

Her students have included:
 Yeon Jun Park

Competitive highlights

References

External links 
 Jean Yun - International Figure Skating Coach
 East West Ice Palace
 Pickwick Ice Center

1958 births
Living people
American figure skating coaches
South Korean sports coaches
Figure skaters from Seoul
South Korean female single skaters
Figure skaters at the 1976 Winter Olympics
Olympic figure skaters of South Korea